In mathematics, the Shimura subgroup Σ(N) is a subgroup of the Jacobian of the modular curve X0(N) of level N, given by the kernel of the natural map to the Jacobian of X1(N). It is named after Goro Shimura. There is a similar subgroup Σ(N,D) associated to Shimura curves of quaternion algebras.

References

Abelian varieties
Modular forms